Mykola Volodymyrovych Porsh was a political and civil activist of Ukraine, economist, member of the Russian Constituent Assembly.

He was a prominent activist of the Revolutionary Ukrainian Party (de facto since 1903) and the Ukrainian Social Democratic Labour Party (since 1905). Porsh was an active member of the Central Council of Ukraine and a General Secretary (minister) of Labor and Military Affairs. Later he served as an ambassador to Germany.

Biography
Mykola Porsh was born on October 19, 1879 in Lubny in a German-Jewish noble family. His father was a jurist.

Mykola Porsh studied at the Lubny Gymnasium and later the Kyiv University of St. Vladimir. From the 1890s he was involved with Marxism, participated in a national movement and soon joined circles of the Revolutionary Ukrainian Party. In 1905 as the party's chairman Porsh replaced Dmytro Antonovych with whom he previously published newspaper "Pratsia" (Labor). Porsh wanted to create new edition of the party's statute changing it from a peasantry orientation to more of workers. In 1906 along with number of other future political leaders (Mykhailo Hrushevsky, Volodymyr Vynnychenko, Symon Petliura) he created the Ukrainian Social Democratic Labour Party. After the liquidation of the RUP, Mykola Porsh emigrated to Lemberg.

In 1917 Mykola Porsh was elected to the Central Council of Ukraine and in November 1917 he was appointed as the General Secretary of Military Affairs. During that time Ukraine was not able to stop advances of the Russian Red Guards and save Kyiv from the Russian occupation. On his submission on January 16, 1918, the Minor Council adopted the law "About People's Army" which regulated the basic principle of creating the Ukrainian Army based on people's militia. During that period 1917-1918, Mykola Porsh headed the Soviet of Workers Deputies.

On July 27, 1918 along with Symon Petliura, Mykola Porsh was arrested as a representative of leftist movements that were involved with created at the People's Administrations Society an organization, goal of which was an armed revolt to overthrow the existing government of the Ukrainian State.

During times of Directorate he was an ambassador in Berlin until 1920. After the government of Ukraine went into exile, Porsh quit political life and permanently settled in Germany. There Porsh wrote number of scientific works.

Mykola Porsh died on April 16, 1944 and was buried in Berlin.

He translated in the Ukrainian language the first volume of the Das Kapital by Karl Marx.

Bibliography
 Porsh, M. About the autonomy. Kyiv 1907

References

External links
 Mykola Porsh. Minor Dictionary on the History of Ukraine.
Mykola Porsh. Encyclopedia of Kyiv

1879 births
1944 deaths
People from Lubny
People from Poltava Governorate
People from the Russian Empire of German descent
Ukrainian people of German descent
Ukrainian people of Jewish descent
Ukrainian people in the Russian Empire
Revolutionary Ukrainian Party politicians
Ukrainian Social Democratic Labour Party politicians
Defence ministers of Ukraine
Russian Constituent Assembly members
Members of the Central Council of Ukraine
Ambassadors of Ukraine to Germany
Labor ministers of Ukraine
Taras Shevchenko National University of Kyiv alumni
Ukrainian translators